Gennady Stanislavovich Churilov (5 May 1987 – 7 September 2011) was a Russian professional ice hockey player. Churilov played for Lokomotiv Yaroslavl of the Kontinental Hockey League (KHL).

Death
On 7 September 2011, Churilov was killed in the 2011 Lokomotiv Yaroslavl plane crash, when a Yakovlev Yak-42 passenger aircraft, carrying nearly his entire Lokomotiv team, crashed just outside Yaroslavl, Russia. The team was traveling to Minsk to play their opening game of the season, with its coaching staff and prospects. Lokomotiv officials said "'everyone from the main roster was on the plane plus four players from the youth team.'"

See also
List of ice hockey players who died during their playing career

References

External links

1987 births
2011 deaths
Lokomotiv Yaroslavl players
People from Magnitogorsk
Russian ice hockey centres
Victims of the Lokomotiv Yaroslavl plane crash
Sportspeople from Chelyabinsk Oblast